7 (stylized as Big Wreck 7) is the seventh studio album by Canadian rock band Big Wreck, released on March 24, 2023. It consists of three five-song EPs that the band released over the course of 16 months entitled 7.1 (on November 19, 2021), 7.2 (on June 17, 2022), and 7.3 (on March 24, 2023), respectively. At a length of over 70 minutes, this is the group's longest album to date. This would also be first Big Wreck album to be recorded without co-founding member and rhythm guitarist Brian Doherty due to his passing in June 2019, as well as the first since 2014's Ghosts to be recorded without long-time drummer Chuck Keeping as he left the group in summer 2021 to focus on family life. Canadian guitarist Chris Caddell of The Wreckage joined as their new rhythm guitarist, and former Thornley drummer and renowned Canadian session drummer Sekou Lumumba joined the band as their new drummer. Both are featured on the recordings.

Background, recording, and promotion 
Following the successful tour of their previous album ...But for the Sun, the band went relatively dark on social media while the COVID-19 pandemic occurred. It was revealed in early 2021 that during this time, the band had recorded 15 new songs that would become the follow-up album. Lead singer and guitarist Ian Thornley shared in an interview that the band had decided to release the new material in increments of five songs spread across three EPs, due to his belief in how music has been consumed differently in recent years and figured that fans would accept the dense amount of new music less overwhelmingly in this format, as opposed to the conventional full-length album format. The three EPs would eventually be put together in a composite release titled 7. Consequently, each EP would be numerically ordered in this format – 7.1, 7.2, and 7.3, respectively. Throughout 2021, Thornley posted several clips on his Instagram page featuring audio and footage from the recording studio, including isolated guitar and vocal takes and rough mixes of certain songs.

In the summer of 2021, the band surprise released two one-off singles with the help of Chad Kroeger of Nickelback entitled "Middle Of Nowhere" and "Ought To Be". Although "Middle Of Nowhere" peaked at #4 on Canada's Active Rock charts – their highest-ranking single since 2011's "Albatross", both songs received mixed reviews and reactions as they were stylistically a departure from the band's typical progressive sound. They were often compared to the Thornley albums from the 2000s, due to the more pop-influenced nature of the songs. These would also be the final songs the band recorded with drummer Chuck Keeping, before Sekou Lumumba assumed his official role in the band. The band also played a handful of drive-in concerts over the summer, where they debuted a brand new song called "Bombs Away".

On October 7, 2021, the band announced the upcoming release of 7.1. The lead single from the project "Bombs Away", and the pre-order for the EP was made available the same day. A second single "Fields", (featuring Daniel Greaves of The Watchmen, and Ian D'Sa of Billy Talent on backing vocals) was released on November 12, 2021. 7.1 was released on November 19, 2021, and the band announced a 15-date tour of Canada. The first half of the tour was postponed to Spring 2022 due to the ongoing COVID-19 pandemic. BRKN LOVE and Monster Truck were the supporting acts for the tour. "Bombs Away" enjoyed moderate success on Canada's Rock radio stations, peaking at #22. Another track from the EP, titled "Beano", did not chart but was featured on multiple Canada Rock-themed playlists on streaming services and quickly became a fan-favourite and a live staple.

The band surprise released a cover of Sting's "Russians" to their Bandcamp website on March 4, 2022, in response to the ongoing Russo-Ukrainian War. All proceeds from the release were donated to the UNHRC. On May 6, 2022, the band released the third single of the project, entitled "Spit It Out," to Canadian radio stations. On June 1, 2022, the band announced the upcoming release of 7.2 and released a fourth single "Better Off". The same day, an exclusive campaign was announced that allowed people to pre-order the EP in several different formats, and each pre-order purchase was entered into a draw to win a turntable and with a one-off vinyl pressing of the EP. One of these exclusive formats included a bonus track, which was a cover of Tears For Fears' "Shout". 7.2 was released on June 17, 2022. On September 30, 2022, the fifth single "Fear & Cowardice" was released to radio with a music video featuring live footage from an exclusive show at The Horseshoe Tavern that took place on July 21, 2022, Ian Thornley's 50th birthday.

On November 24, 2022, bassist Dave McMillan hosted an exclusive livestream and confirmed that 7.3 would be released on March 24, 2023. The band announced a pre-sale campaign similar to that of 7.2, where there were several different formats available on CD to order, including another bonus track. In addition, VIP packages for the final tour of the project included an exclusive autographed cassette of 7 as a composite album with an alternate track listing. The following week on March 10, 2023, 7.3 was made available for digital pre-order and pre-save along with the sixth single of the project "Melody & Sound." The song features a vintage CR-78 drum machine which the band had not utilized in a song since "By The Way," from the band's debut album In Loving Memory Of.... 7.3 (and consequently, 7) was released on March 24, 2023.

Track listing

7.1

7.2

7.3

Limited Cassette Composite Track Listing

Personnel 
Big Wreck

 Ian Thornley – vocals, guitars, keyboards
 Dave McMillan – bass guitar, backing vocals
 Chris Caddell – guitar, backing vocals
 Sekou Lumumba – drums, percussion

Additional musicians 

 Daniel Greaves – additional background vocals on "Fields"
 Ian D'Sa – additional background vocals and guitar on "Fields"
 Tyler Tasson – additional background vocals on "Better Off"

References 

2023 albums
Big Wreck albums
Warner Music Group albums
Albums recorded at Noble Street Studios